Pacificanthia is a genus of soldier beetles in the family Cantharidae. There are at least four described species in Pacificanthia.

Species
These four species belong to the genus Pacificanthia:
 Pacificanthia consors (LeConte, 1851)
 Pacificanthia curtisi (Kirby, 1837)
 Pacificanthia downiei Kazantsev, 2001
 Pacificanthia rotundicollis (Say, 1825)

References

Further reading

 
 
 

Cantharidae
Articles created by Qbugbot